The Eurocheque was a type of cheque used in Europe that was accepted across national borders and which could be written in a variety of currencies.

Eurocheques were originally introduced in 1969 as an alternative to the traveler's cheque and for international payments for goods and services. They were rapidly adopted for domestic use in a number of countries, to the extent that their use for international payment rarely accounted for more than 5% of total Eurocheque transactions. The charges for clearing Eurocheques were substantially lower than those for cross-border use of domestic cheques.

Although still accepted as payment by a few bodies, the practice of issuing Eurocheques ceased on 1 January 2002, following the decision to withdraw the Eurocheque guarantee.

Eurocheques were particularly popular in German-speaking countries, where they were often issued as standard domestic cheques. They usually had to be accompanied by a cheque guarantee card in order to be accepted in payment at a point of sale. The Eurocheque guarantee card also had the functionality of an ATM card. In some countries, such as Austria and Germany, virtually all Eurocheque cards were co-branded with the logo of the respective domestic debit card system and were actually debit cards. After its phase-out, virtually all of these Eurocheque cards were replaced by Maestro cards. Therefore, Maestro is very often considered to be the successor to the Eurocheque system.

The decision to end the issuing of Eurocheques was taken because increasing numbers of retailers and banks started to decline payment by Eurocheque and because the use of cash machines and credit cards by international travellers grew within Europe. The relatively high cost of processing Eurocheques, together with the costs resulting from fraud, were also among the factors. In advance of the move, the European Commission expressed concern that "the benefits of the existing eurocheque system, in particular its standardised cheque format and its clearing facilities in all European countries should not be lost."

History

The Eurocheque was launched in 1969 with the participation of banks in 14 countries: Belgium, France, United Kingdom, the Netherlands, Austria, Switzerland and West Germany (which issued and accepted Eurocheques) together with Denmark, Italy, Ireland, Luxembourg, Norway, Spain and Sweden (which accepted Eurocheques).

In 1972, the 'uniform Eurocheque' and 'uniform Eurocheque guarantee card' were introduced, providing single designs that could be used by all banks within the system. Previously all Eurocheques had carried the Eurocheque symbol, but differed in their designs.

Eurocheque International C.V. was formed in 1974 to process payments made using Eurocheques.

In 1983, British banks withdrew the Eurocheque symbol from their credit cards.

On 3 February 1988, Eurocheque International became a cooperative society established under Belgian law, having previously been a de facto association, rather than a legal entity. The shareholders were the Association of Swedish Banks, Associazione Bancaria Italiana, Groupement des cartes bancaires 'CB' (France), Comunidade Portuguesa eurocheque, Bank of Cyprus, Caisse d'épargne de l'État du grand-duché de Luxembourg, Agrupació Andorrana Eurocheque, PBS-Pengeinstitutternes BetalingsSystemer (Denmark), Apacs (United Kingdom), Telekurs (Switzerland), Suomen Pankkiyhdistys (Finland), Association of Norwegian Banks, Stichting Bevordering Chequeverkeer (Netherlands), Irish Clearing House, Jugobanka United Bank (Yugoslavia), Association of Austrian Banks and Bankers, Eurocheque Belgique sc, GZS-Gesellschaft für Zahlungssysteme GmbH (Germany).

According to an estimate by Eurocheque International, in 1989 around 32 million Eurocheque cards had been issued by some 9,000 banks in 20 countries.

By the end of 1998, there were 46 participating countries, 22 of them both issuing and accepting the cheques: Belgium, Denmark, Germany, Finland, France, United Kingdom, Ireland, Israel, Italy, Croatia, Luxembourg, Malta, Netherlands, Poland, Portugal, Switzerland, Slovenia, Spain, the Czech Republic, Hungary, Cyprus, and 24 accepting cheques: Egypt, Albania, Algeria, Andorra, Armenia, Azerbaijan, Bosnia-Herzegovina, Bulgaria, Georgia, Gibraltar, Greece, Iceland, Lebanon, Lithuania, Latvia, Morocco, Macedonia, Romania, Russia, Slovakia, Tunisia, Turkey, Ukraine, Belarus.

In 1989, French banks withdrew the Eurocheque symbol from their credit cards. In the same year, the use of the Uniform Eurocheque format became universal.

On 1 September 1992, Eurocheque International C.V. and Eurocheque International Holding N.V. merged with Eurocard International N.V. into a single company, Europay International S.A., incorporated under Belgian law. Europay relocated to Waterloo, Belgium, where they shared the same address as the Europe, Middle East and Africa region of MasterCard International, and the headquarters of the Eurocard-MasterCard joint-venture, Maestro International.

The decision to end the Eurocheque guarantee from the end of 2002 was taken by Europay's board on 22 April 2001.

See also
 Traveler's cheque

References 

Cheques
Banking terms
Exonumia
Economy of Europe
1969 establishments in Europe
Organizations established in 1988
1992 mergers and acquisitions
2002 disestablishments in Europe
Products and services discontinued in 2002